Xyroptila soma is a moth of the family Pterophoridae. It is found in India (northern Kanara).

References

External links

Moths described in 2006
soma
Moths of Asia